Yelevo is a rural locality (a village) in Gaynskoye Rural Settlement, Gaynsky District, Perm Krai, Russia. The population was 51 as of 2010. There are 4 streets.

Geography 
Yelevo is located 11 km south of Gayny (the district's administrative centre) by road. Modorobo is the nearest rural locality.

References 

Rural localities in Gaynsky District